Henry Marshall (22 April 1831 – 30 April 1914) was an English first-class cricketer active 1853–63 who played for Surrey. He was born in Godalming and died in Ipswich. He played in 17 first-class matches.

References

1831 births
1914 deaths
English cricketers
Surrey cricketers
Marylebone Cricket Club cricketers
Gentlemen of England cricketers
Surrey Club cricketers
Gentlemen of the South cricketers
People from Godalming
Gentlemen of Marylebone Cricket Club cricketers